Jane Smiley Cronin Scanlon (July 17, 1922 – June 19, 2018) was an American mathematician and an emeritus professor of mathematics at Rutgers University. Her research concerned partial differential equations and mathematical biology.

Education and career
Scanlon earned a bachelor's degree in mathematics from Wayne University (now Wayne State University). She completed her Ph.D. in mathematics at the University of Michigan in 1949, under the supervision of Erich Rothe. Her dissertation was Branch Points of Solutions of Equations in Banach Space.

After working for the United States Air Force and the American Optical Company, she returned to academia as a lecturer at Wheaton College (Massachusetts) and then Stonehill College.
She moved to the Polytechnic Institute of Brooklyn in 1957, and to Rutgers in 1965. She retired in 1991. During her twenty-six years at Rutgers, she supervised seven doctoral students.

She died in June 2018 at the age of 95.

Recognition
Scanlon was a Noether Lecturer in 1985, and Pi Mu Epsilon J. Sutherland Frame Lecturer in 1989. Her talks concerned "entrainment of frequency" and the application of this principle to mathematical models of the Purkinje fibers in the heart. In 2012, she became one of the inaugural fellows of the American Mathematical Society.

Personal life
She married the physicist Joseph Scanlon in 1953. The two divorced in 1979. Upon her death, she was survived by four children and seven grandchildren.

Selected publications

Articles

Books
 Advanced Calculus, Boston, Heath 1967
 Differential equations: Introduction and Qualitative Theory, Dekker 1980, 2nd edition 1994, 3rd edition CRC/Chapman and Hall 2008
 Fixed points and topological degrees in nonlinear analysis, American Mathematical Society 1964; 1995 pbk edition of 1972 reprint with corrections
 Mathematical aspects of the Hodgkin-Huxley neural theory, Cambridge University Press 1987
 Mathematics of Cell Electrophysiology, Dekker 1981

as editor

References

External links

1922 births
2018 deaths
20th-century American mathematicians
American women mathematicians
Wayne State University alumni
University of Michigan alumni
Wheaton College (Massachusetts) faculty
Rutgers University faculty
Fellows of the American Mathematical Society
20th-century women mathematicians
20th-century American women
United States Air Force civilians
21st-century American women
People from Manhattan